Christopher Barker may refer to:

Christopher Barker (officer of arms) (died 1550), English officer of arms
Christopher Barker (printer) ( 1529–1599), printer to Queen Elizabeth I
Chris Barker (linguist), American professor of linguistics at New York University 
Chris Barker (1980–2020), English footballer
Chris Barker (American football) (born 1990), American football offensive guard
Chris Barker, bassist of punk group Anti-Flag

See also
Christopher Baker (disambiguation)